Gita Press is the world's largest publisher of Hindu religious texts. It is located in Gorakhpur city of India's Uttar Pradesh state. It was founded in 1923 by Jaya Dayal Goyanka and Ghanshyam Das Jalan for promoting the principles of Sanatana Dharma. Hanuman Prasad Poddar better known as "Bhaiji" was the founding and the lifetime editor of its noted magazine who also wrote articles with his pen name "SHIV", Kalyan. It started publishing in 1927, with a circulation of 1,600 copies and at present its print order had reached 250,000 (in 2012). The Gita Press archives contain over 3,500 manuscripts including over 100 interpretations of the Bhagwad Gita.

Seth Jaya Dayal Goyanka, Shri Hanuman Prasad Poddar and Shri Ghanshyam Das Jalan,  Gita preachers set up the Gita Press on 29 April 1923, as a unit of Gobind Bhawan Karyalaya registered under the Societies Registration Act, 1860 (presently governed by the West Bengal Societies Act, 1960). Five months later it acquired its first printing machine for Rs 600. Since its establishment, the Gita Press has published approximately 410 million copies of the Gita (in different editions) and 70.0 million copies of the Ramcharitamanas, at subsidized prices. Gita Press completed its hundred years in 2022. Former President Ram Nath Kovind had started its centenary celebrations on 4th May 2022.

It temporarily shut down in December 2014 over wage issues,  but work resumed a few days later.

Publications

Magazines
Kalyan (in Hindi) is a monthly magazine being published since 1927. It has articles devoted to various religious topics promoting uplifting thought and good deeds. Writings by Indian saints and scholars are regularly published in the magazine.
Kalyana-Kalpataru (in English) is also a monthly and has been published since 1934. Its contents are similar to Kalyan.
Neither of these magazines runs any advertisements.
Online Kalyana and Kalyana-Kalptaru Subscription

Religious texts
These texts are published in Sanskrit, Hindi, Marathi, English, Kannada, Tamil, Telugu, Gujarati, Bengali, Oriya and other languages of India.
Shrimad Bhagvad Gita (several formats)
The Mahabharata
Shri Ramcharitmanas by Tulsidas (several formats), Telugu version (2002)
Other works by Tulsidas
Valmiki Ramayana (several formats)
Scriptures (Puranas, Upanishads and others)
Works by Soordas
Books by Swami Ramsukhdas
Books by Hanuman Prasad Poddar
Books by Jaydayal Goyandaka

Other publications 
Bhakta-Gathas and Bhajans
Small books geared towards children

Branches 

Gita Press has the branches and stalls in following locations. Most of the stalls are operated in railway platforms except Churu and Nadiyad. Churu has a stall near Rishikul Brahmacharyashram vedic school and Nadiyad has a stall near Santram Temple.

Gita Press Art Gallery (Lila chitra mandir)

The Art Gallery has the lilas (works or plays) of Shri Rama and Shri Krishna portrayed in 684 paintings by famed artists of the past and present. Other paintings, including Mewari style paintings of the Shri Krishna Lila are also on exhibit. The entire 700 verses of the Bhagvad Gita are displayed on marble plaques affixed to the walls.

Affiliated organizations
The Gita Press is part of the Govind Bhawan Karyalaya, Kolkata.

Other affiliated institutions are:
Gita Bhavan, A satsang Bhawan in which tourist live for free and without paying anything Muni Ki Reti, Rishikesh
Rishikul-Brahmacharya Ashram (Vedic school), Churu, Rajasthan.
Ayurved Sansthan (producer of Ayurvedic medicines), Rishikesh.
Gita Press Seva Dal (Philanthropic organization for natural calamities).
Hasta Nirmit Vastra Vibhag quality cloth shop in Gorakhpur, Rishikesh, Kanpur and Kolkata

See also
Hanuman Prasad Poddar
Sri Venkateswar Steam Press

References

External links

Official Book Store Of Gita Press Gorakhpur. 
Gita Press Online Store

Publishing in India
Religious tract publishing companies
Book publishing companies of India
Hindu organizations
Indian literature
Publishing companies established in 1923
Gorakhpur
Religious mass media in India
Hindu mass media
Translators of the Bhagavad Gita
Indian companies established in 1923